Daily Mail and General Trust (DMGT) is a British multinational media company, the owner of the Daily Mail and several other titles. The 4th Viscount Rothermere is the chairman and controlling shareholder of the company. The head office is located in Northcliffe House in Kensington, London. In January 2022, DMGT delisted from the London Stock Exchange following a successful offer for DMGT by Rothermere Continuation Limited.

History
The group traces its origins to the launch in 1896 of the mid-market national newspaper the Daily Mail  by Harold Harmsworth (later created, in July 1919, The 1st Viscount Rothermere) and his elder brother, Alfred. It was incorporated in 1922 and its shares were first listed on the London Stock Exchange in 1932. 

The 1st Viscount Rothermere's son, Esmond, took operational control of the organization in 1932 and complete control in November 1940, when his father died.

Vere Harmsworth became the Chairman of Associated Newspapers in 1970. Upon the death of his father in July 1978, he succeeded as The 3rd Viscount Rothermere and became chairman of parent Daily Mail and General Trust plc.

After almost 100 years in Fleet Street, the company left its original premises of New Carmelite House in Fleet Street in 1988 to move to Northcliffe House in Kensington.

In 2019, DMGT joined the Belt and Road News Network.

Divisions

Consumer Media

dmg media and Harmsworth Media are the media subsidiaries of DMGT and publish the following titles:

Daily Mail – dmg media's primary national newspaper.
The Mail on Sunday – The sister paper of the Daily Mail, published weekly on Sundays. First published in 1982.
Ireland on Sunday – Associated Newspapers took over the publishing of Ireland on Sunday in 2001. The title was re-launched in April 2002 to coincide with the move to its new offices in Ballsbridge, Dublin. It included TV Week magazine and in September 2006 it was merged with the Mail on Sunday and became the Irish Mail on Sunday.
i – National newspaper originally launched as a sister paper to The Independent. Bought in November 2019 for £49.6 million.
Metro – Metro is a national newspaper. Launched in March 1999 as a free, stapled newspaper, it was distributed initially in London. But since has been published every weekday morning, around Yorkshire, the North West, Newcastle and the North East, the East Midlands, Bristol, Birmingham, Liverpool, Cardiff and Scotland.
Metro.co.uk is a UK-based online newspaper. Originally created in 2002 as the digital counterpart to the print Metro, it now operates as an independent publication within the DMG group, attracting a daily audience of over 1.6 million.
MailOnline is one of the world's most popular English language newspaper websites 
New Scientist – a weekly magazine focusing on science and technology. Bought in 2021 for £70 million.

The London Evening Standard was owned by DMGT until it was sold to Alexander Lebedev in January 2009. DMGT still maintains a 5% share.

Property information
In the UK, Landmark Information Group includes Landmark and SearchFlow and provide information for property transactions. Trepp, in the US, provides similar services.

Corporate services
DMGT ventures is the venture capital arm of DMGT. Investments include used-car platform Cazoo, property investment platform Bricklane, and will-writing platform Farewill.

Head office

The head office is located in Northcliffe House in Kensington, London Borough of Kensington and Chelsea. In addition to housing the DMGT head office, the building also houses the offices of The Independent, i, Daily Mail, Mail on Sunday, Evening Standard, Metro and Metro.co.uk.

Charity 
Upon the outbreak of the Russian invasion of Ukraine, DMGT donated £500,000 to help the victims and refugees.

See also

Multinational companies
Viscount Rothermere
Mass media
 List of companies based in London

References

External links
Daily Mail and General Trust

 
Financial services companies established in 1922
Newspaper companies of the United Kingdom
Multinational companies headquartered in the United Kingdom
Companies based in the Royal Borough of Kensington and Chelsea
Companies listed on the London Stock Exchange
Conglomerate companies established in 1922
Insurance companies of the United Kingdom
1922 establishments in England
Mass media companies established in 1922
Companies based in Stamford, Connecticut